Cropley may refer to:

Cropley (surname)
Cropley (VTA)
Cropley baronets
Cropley Lake, alpine lake in Juneau, Alaska, United States